Anthidium severini is a species of bee in the family Megachilidae, the leaf-cutter, carder, or mason bees.

Distribution
Africa

Synonyms
Synonyms for this species include:
Anthidium severini daressalamicum Strand, 1922
Anthidium kobrowi Brauns, 1912
Anthidium maximum Friese, 1922
Anthidium michaelis Cockerell, 1930
Anthidium severini melanaspis Cockerell, 1936
Anthidium severini eriksoni Mavromoustakis, 1940

References

severini
Insects described in 1903